Zeki Elyıldırım (born 16 September 1943) is a Turkish alpine skier. He competed in the men's giant slalom at the 1968 Winter Olympics.

References

1943 births
Living people
Turkish male alpine skiers
Olympic alpine skiers of Turkey
Alpine skiers at the 1968 Winter Olympics
Sportspeople from Kars
20th-century Turkish people